Mníšek nad Hnilcom is a village and municipality in the Gelnica District in the Košice Region of eastern Slovakia. Total municipality population was in 2011 1688 inhabitants. It belonged to a German language island. The German population was expelled in 1945.

References

External links
 Official homepage
 Touristic information Mníšek nad Hnilcom
 http://en.e-obce.sk/obec/mniseknadhnilcom/mnisek-nad-hnilcom.html

Villages and municipalities in Gelnica District